Munmudaewang-myeon is a myeon or a township in the administrative subdivisions of the Gyeongju City, North Gyeongsang province, South Korea. It is bordered by Gampo-eup and Sea of Japan (East Sea) on the east, Yangnam-myeon on the south, Bulguk-dong, Bodeok-dong and Oedong-eup on the west and Ocheon-eup and Janggi-myeon of the Pohang city on the north. Its 120.06 square kilometers are home to about  4,558 people. This population is served by one joint elementary-middle school.

Administrative divisions
Gugil-ri (구길리)
Gwoni-ri (권이리)
Dusan-ri (두산리)
Beopgok-ri (범곡리)
Bonggil-ri (봉길리)
Songjeon-ri (송전리)
Andong-ri (안동리)
Eoil-ri (어일리)
Waeup-ri (와읍리)
Yongdang-ri (용당리)
Yongdong-ri (용동리)
Ipcheon-ri (입천리)
Janghang-ri (장항리)
Jukjeon-ri (죽전리)
Hoam-ri (호암리)

See also 

 Administrative divisions of South Korea
 Subdivisions of Gyeongju

References

External links
 The official site of the Yangbuk-myeon office

Subdivisions of Gyeongju
Towns and townships in North Gyeongsang Province